Toroa can refer to:

 Northern royal albatross
 Southern royal albatross
 Toroa (ferry), an Auckland, New Zealand passenger ferry
 Toroa (leafhopper), a leafhopper genus in the tribe Erythroneurini
 Toroa (sculpture), a 1989 sculpture by Peter Nicholls in Dunedin, New Zealand